Badara Badji (born 24 February 1994) is a Senegalese professional footballer who plays for Inđija.

He had stints with ASC Yeggo, Dinamo Zagreb B, Odisha, Mladost Lučani, Inđija, Zvijezda 09 and Tuzla City, and has also represented the Senegal national team.

Club career

Early career
Badji was born in Dakar, Senegal. He played in his home country with ASC Yeggo in the 2013 and 2013–14 Senegal Premier League. He came to Yeggo from the Académie Mawade Wade.

While playing with Yeggo, he was selected to be part of the Senegal national U20 team at the 2013 Jeux de la Francophonie

Dinamo Zagreb
In the summer of 2014, Badji joined Croatian powerhouse Dinamo Zagreb on a two-year loan spell. He had also made appearances for the Senegal national team by the time he joined Dinamo.

He was a regular and a prolific scorer for the Dinamo Zagreb B team during the two seasons he spent there, the first one playing in the 2014–15 3. HNL and next in the 2015–16 2. HNL.

Badji has also made a solitary appearance for the Dinamo Zagreb main team, in a 2015–16 Croatian Cup first-round game against Oštrc Zlatar.

Delhi Dynamos
Badji signed for Delhi Dynamos FC, 15 days before the start of the season to pair up with Richard Gadze and Marcelinho on the Odisha frontline.

Mladost Lučani
On 21 January 2018, Badji signed with Serbian top-flight side Mladost Lučani.

Inđija
Following summer, he moved to FK Inđija and played with them the 2018–19 Serbian First League season.

Zvijezda 09
In July 2019, Badji signed a contract with Bosnian Premier League club Zvijezda 09. He made his debut for Zvijezda 09 on 20 July 2019, in a 1–5 home league loss against Tuzla City.

Tuzla City
On 11 January 2020, Badji left Zvijezda 09 and then signed a two-and-a-half-year contract with another Bosnian Premier League club, Tuzla City. He made his official debut for Tuzla City on 22 February 2020, in a 6–2 home loss against Sarajevo, a game in which Badji earned a direct red card in the 42nd minute of the game. He left Tuzla City in June 2021.

International career
Badji made 3 appearances having scored 2 goals for the Senegal national U20 team. He then made 7 appearances having scored 3 goals for the U23 national team.

Badji also made 2 appearances for the main Senegal national team in 2013.

Honours
Dinamo Zagreb
1. HNL: 2015–16
Croatian Cup: 2015–16

References

External links
Badara Badji at Sofascore

1994 births
Living people
Footballers from Dakar
Senegalese footballers
Senegal international footballers
GNK Dinamo Zagreb players
Expatriate footballers in Croatia
Senegalese expatriate sportspeople in Croatia
Odisha FC players
Indian Super League players
Expatriate footballers in India
FK Mladost Lučani players
FK Inđija players
FK Zvijezda 09 players
FK Tuzla City players
Serbian SuperLiga players
Serbian First League players
Expatriate footballers in Serbia
Premier League of Bosnia and Herzegovina players
Expatriate footballers in Bosnia and Herzegovina
Association football forwards